Mohamed Camara (born 16 March 2000) is a Guinean footballer who currently plays as a goalkeeper for CI Kamsar. He is the son of Guinean Goalkeeping legend Kemoko Camara.

Career statistics

International

References

2000 births
Living people
Guinean footballers
Guinea youth international footballers
Guinea international footballers
Association football goalkeepers
AS Kaloum Star players
Guinea A' international footballers
2020 African Nations Championship players